A 28-mile (45.1 km) trail between Ham Hill in Somerset and Lyme Regis in Dorset, England.

History
The route of the Liberty Trail route is based on information recorded by six rebels from various villages in Somerset and Dorset. Villagers from the two counties made their way to join the Protestant Monmouth Rebellion in 1685.  The rebels wore green sprigs tucked into their hats to declare their support for Monmouth. Weapons that they carried included farm scythes and other suitable agricultural tools.

Route

Below are six possible walking stages that may be used to traverse the Liberty Trail:

Ham Hill to West Chinnock -  - 1.75 hours
West Chinnock to Misterton -  - 2.5 hours
Misterton to Wayford -  - 2 hours
Wayford to Thorncombe -  - 3 hours
Thorncombe to Wootton Fitzpaine -  - 2.75 hours
Wootton Fitzpaine to Lyme Regis -  - 2 hours

Places of interest
At Ham Hill there are links with other Trails including the Monarch's Way, Leland Trail and River Parrett Trail. Ham Hill Iron Age Hill Fort is one of the largest in Europe. Many local buildings are made from the local yellow Hamstone. At Wayford is Clapton Court Gardens, one of Somerset's more historic gardens that are open to the public. Forde Abbey is situated on a curved section of the River Axe, its original purpose was as a Cistercian Monastery. It has a garden of some elegance which has won many awards.  At this location the Dorset Jubilee Trail crosses over the path of the Liberty Trail. Two other Iron Age Hill Forts may be seen at this stage, the first one is Lambert's Castle and further on is Coney's Castle. During clear weather conditions Chesil Beach and Portland Bill are visible, both are famous features of this part of the South coast of England. Lyme Regis is located to the west of Chesil Beach on the Jurassic Coast, a place where many fossils may be found. The Cobb at Lyme Regis was the location for The French Lieutenant's Woman (film) in 1981. The South West Coast Path also leads into this part of the town.

Sections of the Liberty Trail also form part of other trails in the area, such as the Macmillan Way West, River Parrett Trail, Wessex Ridgeway.

Further detail of the Liberty Trail is available from Yeovil Tourist Information Centre and South Somerset Tourist Information.

Way points and maps

Ordnance Survey Explorer map series:- 129 - Yeovil & Sherborne (Sherbourne), :-
116 - Lyme Regis & Bridport, provide the geographical details for this trail.

References

External links
Geology of Lyme Regis area
Landslides at Lyme Regis British Geological Survey

Footpaths in Somerset